"Too Shy Shy Boy!" is the fourth single by Japanese recording artist Arisa Mizuki. It was released on May 27, 1992 as the lead single from Mizuki's second studio album Shake Your Body for Me. The title track was written and produced by Tetsuya Komuro. It was used in commercials for the soft drink Chasse by Kirin, starring Mizuki herself. Komuro recorded a self-cover of the song for his album Hit Factory. "Too Shy Shy Boy!" is Mizuki's best-selling single. The B-side, "Haru no Tobira," was written and produced by singer-songwriter Midori Karashima and was used in commercials for the Soft MA contact lenses by Menicon, also starring Mizuki.

Chart performance 
"Too Shy Shy Boy!" debuted on the Oricon Weekly Singles chart at number 4 with 83,750 copies sold in its first week. The single charted for eighteen weeks and has sold a total of 362,680 copies. "Too Shy Shy Boy!" was the 7th best-selling single in June and July 1992. It ranked number 54 on the Oricon Yearly Singles chart.

Track listing

Charts

References 

1992 singles
Alisa Mizuki songs
Song recordings produced by Tetsuya Komuro
Songs written by Tetsuya Komuro
1992 songs